Black Dossier (French: Le Dossier noir, Italian: Fascicolo nero) is a 1955 French-Italian crime drama film directed by André Cayatte and starring Jean-Marc Bory, Danièle Delorme and Lea Padovani. It was shot at the Boulogne Studios in Paris. The film's sets were designed by the art director Jacques Colombier. It was entered into the 1955 Cannes Film Festival.

Plot
Jacques Arnaud arrives in a small town somewhere in the province. Soon a citizen reports to him that strangers have broken into his house where they stole a mysterious "black dossier". This file had been given to him by a recently demised citizen named Le Guen. The content of this file included information on the town's foremost businessman who behind his proper façade seems to be a ruthless fraudster. Arnaud has the corps of Le Guen exhumed and proof is found that this man has died of poisoning.

Cast

 Jean-Marc Bory as Judge Jacques Arnaud
 Danièle Delorme as Yvonne Dutoit
 Bernard Blier as Commissaire Noblet
 Lea Padovani as Françoise Le Guen
 Antoine Balpêtré as Dutoit
 Paul Frankeur as Charles Broussard
 Nelly Borgeaud as Danièle Limousin
 Noël Roquevert as Commissaire Franconi
 Daniel Cauchy as Jo
 Giani Esposito as Jean de Montesson
 Jacques Duby as Flavier
 Henri Crémieux as Le procureur Limousin
 Christian Fourcade as Alain Le Guen
 André Valmy as Inspecteur Carlier
 Gabrielle Fontan as Mme. Micoulin - la logeuse
 Nadine Basile as Suzanne Broussard
 Enrico Glori as Vaillant
 Gabriel Gobin as Le brigadier
 Charles Lemontier as Un journaliste
 Liliane Maigné as 	Florence
 Héléna Manson as 	Madame Limousin
 Madeleine Suffel as 	La voisine
 Monette Dinay as Thérèse 
 Yvette Etiévant as Madame Piriou
 Guy Decomble as L'inspecteur Leroy
 Maria Zanoli as 	Marthe
 Lucien Nat as Docteur Dessouche 
 Lucien Raimbourg as Titiche
 Sylvie as Madame Baju
 Edmond Ardisson as Le restaurateur
 Jean-Pierre Grenier as Gilbert Le Guen
 Madeleine Barbulée as Mademoiselle Limousin

References

External links

 Black Dossier at filmsdefrance.com

1955 films
1955 crime drama films
French crime drama films
1950s French-language films
French black-and-white films
Films directed by André Cayatte
1950s French films
1950s Italian films
Italian crime films
Films shot at Boulogne Studios